Halik or Halík may refer to the following people:
Given name
Halik Kochanski, British historian and writer

Surname
Karel Halík (1883–?), Czech wrestler
Nik Halik (born 1969), Australian financial entrepreneur and civilian cosmonaut
Tomáš Halík (born 1948), Czech Roman Catholic priest, philosopher, theologian and scholar
Tony Halik (1921–1998), Polish traveler and explorer